Glyphipterix dolichophyes is a species of sedge moth in the genus Glyphipterix. It was described by Alexey Diakonoff in 1978. It is found in China (Lungtan, Hungshan, western Tien-mu-shan).

References

Moths described in 1978
Glyphipterigidae
Moths of Asia